Alberta Provincial Highway No. 11, commonly referred to as Highway 11 and officially named the David Thompson Highway, is a provincial highway in central Alberta, Canada. It passes by Nordegg and through Rocky Mountain House, Sylvan Lake and Red Deer along its course. The highway is named after David Thompson, a British-Canadian fur trader, surveyor, and map-maker who explored the area between Rocky Mountain House and Kootenae House (near present-day Invermere, British Columbia) through Howse Pass.

Route description 

The majority of Highway 11 is maintained by Alberta Transportation. The segment within Banff National Park is maintained by the Government of Canada, and within Red Deer limits the city has jurisdiction and is responsible for maintenance. It begins at the Icefields Parkway (Highway 93) and travels east for  through Banff National Park, where traffic is required to purchase a national parks pass.

Beyond Banff National Park, the highway parallels the North Saskatchewan River and traverses the sparsely populated Rocky Mountains Forest Reserve. It passes by west shore of Abraham Lake and Nordegg.  The highway continues east to Rocky Mountain House, where it is concurrent with Highway 22. Continuing east, the highway passes Alhambra, Condor, Eckville, and Benalto before bypassing Sylvan Lake and entering the City of Red Deer. The highway is a four-lane divided highway between Highway 20 and Red Deer, and crosses a causeway and bridge over Cygnet Lake.

Highway 11 meets Highway 2 (Queen Elizabeth II Highway) at an interchange, entering Red Deer as 67 Street. It intersects Gaetz Avenue (Highway 2A) north of Downtown Red Deer near Parkland Mall, and crosses the Red Deer River before turning south and becoming 30 Avenue. At 55 Street, Highway 11 turns east and exits Red Deer, for a total length of  within the city.

The highway passes the Canyon Ski Area, crosses the Red Deer River and passes Joffre. East of Joffre, the highway follows the top of the Red Deer River valley and intersects Highway 21.

Future

Red Deer area 
Traffic levels on Highway 11 have gradually increased west of Red Deer, resulting in multiple studies by Alberta Transportation for long-term planning of upgrades to the route. The studies call for the highway to be upgraded to a freeway standard in which all at-grade intersections would be removed between Highway 2 in Red Deer and the intersection at Highway 20 in Sylvan Lake. There is also a plan that calls for the permanent closure of the Highway 781/50 Street intersection, with Highway 781 being realigned to the Highway 20 intersection. There is also a study on twinning Highway 11 between Sylvan Lake and Highway 766 north near Eckville. Presently the improvements are unfunded.

Red Deer is also constructing the North Highway Connector, also known as Northland Drive, which will serve as a northern bypass. The connector begins at the Highway 2A/11A intersection, crosses the Red Deer River, and connects with Highway 11 in eastern Red Deer. Phase I is currently under construction connects with Highway 11 at 30 Avenue / 67 Street intersection, while a proposed Phase II would connect with 20 Avenue approximately  further to the east.

Alberta Transportation also has right of way to realign Highway 11 east of Red Deer, bypassing its present 55 Street alignment; documentation temporarily refers to this alignment as Highway 11X.

Howse Pass 
There have also been proposals to extend Highway 11 west of Highway 93 across Howse Pass and connect with British Columbia Highway 1 northwest of Golden, British Columbia, known as the 'Howse Pass Highway'. Proponents of the highway argue that it would provide an alternate route to British Columbia and would relieve congestion along the Trans-Canada Highway and the Yellowhead Highway.

Opponents of the highway argue that it would cause significant environmental impact in an ecologically sensitive area, especially within Banff National Park which is a protected area. They also argue that it would be cost prohibitive constructing the British Columbia section of the highway along the Blaeberry River, especially since the Trans-Canada Highway and the Yellowhead Highway are requiring significant upgrades, and it is a low priority in British Columbia. Howse Pass is also designated as a National Historic Site which further protects the area from development and as a result it is unlikely that the highway will be constructed.

Major intersections 
From west to east:

References

External links 

Central Provincial Highway Projects by Alberta Transportation
The Cowboy Trail. David Thompson Highway Day Trip.
Mile by Mile. Alberta Highway # 11

011
Transport in Red Deer, Alberta